The 2017 FIBA Women's Melanesian Basketball Cup was an international basketball tournament contested by nations of the newly formed Melanesia FIBA Oceania sub-zone. The inaugural edition of the women's tournament were held together alongside the Men's tournament in Port Moresby, Papua New Guinea from 27 to 30 September 2017. Matches were played at the Taurama Aquatic and Indoor Centre. It was officially launched on 19 May 2017.

The tournament served as qualifiers for the women's basketball event of the 2019 Pacific Games in Apia, Samoa with three berths for Melanesia allocated for the top three teams in this tournament. Hosts Papua New Guinea dominated the women's tournament winning all of their games including the final.

Teams
The following national teams participated in the tournament.

 

 (Hosts)

 (withdrew)

Preliminary round
Papua New Guinea dominated the preliminary round with an unbeaten record.

Final round

Bronze medal game

Gold medal game

Final standings
The top three teams qualified for the 2019 Pacific Games.

Awards 

 All-Star Team:
  Letava Whippy
  Marca Muri
  Yolande Luepak
  Betty Angula
  Joycelyn Basia

See also
 2017 FIBA Melanesia Basketball Cup (men's tournament)
 2018 FIBA Women's Polynesia Basketball Cup
 Basketball at the 2018 Micronesian Games
 Basketball at the 2019 Pacific Games

References

Melanesian Basketball Cup, 2017
Melanesian Basketball Cup, 2017
International sports competitions hosted by Papua New Guinea